The chief administrative officer of the United States House of Representatives (CAO) is charged with carrying out administrative functions for the House, including human resources, information resources, payroll, finance, procurement, and other business services.

Along with the other House officers, the chief administrative officer is elected every two years when the House organizes for a new Congress. The majority and minority party conferences (the Democratic Caucus of the United States House of Representatives and Republican Conference of the United States House of Representatives) nominate candidates for the House officer positions after the election of the speaker of the House. The full House adopts a resolution to elect the officers, who will begin serving the Membership after they have taken the oath of office.

The office of the chief administrative officer was first created during the 104th Congress, which met from January 3, 1995, to January 3, 1997. It replaced the position of the doorkeeper of the United States House of Representatives, which was abolished at the same time. Scot Faulkner of West Virginia served as the first CAO.  During his tenure he led the reform of the scandal-plagued House financial system, abolished the Folding Room, and privatized Postal operations, printing, and shoe repair.  Mr. Faulkner's office also implemented the first House Intranet (CyberCongress) and expanded digital camera coverage of the House Chamber and committee rooms.  Faulkner's reform efforts are chronicled in the books Naked Emperors (Rowman & Littlefield Publishers, Inc., February 2008) and Inside Congress (Pocket Books, August 1998; ].

The current CAO, Catherine Szpindor, took office on January 3, 2021. John Clocker is deputy chief administrative officer for the U.S. House of Representatives.

List of chief administrative officers
This table represents those who have served as chief administrative officer of the United States House of Representatives. The table lists the CAO who began each Congress; term of service may end before the sitting Congress if they resigned early.

References

External links
 

Employees of the United States House of Representatives